Asad Ullah Khan is an Indian microbiologist, biochemist and a professor at the Interdisciplinary Biotechnology Unit of the Aligarh Muslim University. He is known for his studies on multidrug resistant clinical strains as well as for the first sighting in India of Aligarh super bug (NDM-4), a variant of New Delhi metallo-beta-lactamase 1 (NDM-1). He is an elected fellow of the Royal Society of Chemistry, the Biotech Research Society, India and the Indian Academy of Microbiological Sciences. The Department of Biotechnology of the Government of India awarded him the National Bioscience Award for Career Development, one of the highest Indian science awards, for his contributions to biosciences, in 2012.

Biography 

Dr. Asad Ullah Khan did his undergraduate studies in chemistry and post-graduate studies in biotechnology at the Aligarh Muslim University (AMU) after which he pursued his doctoral studies at the International Centre for Genetic Engineering and Biotechnology, New Delhi to secure a PhD in biochemistry from Aligarh Muslim University. He started his career as a lecturer at AMU in 1997 and during his career there, he did his post-doctoral studies at Rutgers University during 2000–03. He returned to India to resume his career at AMU where he holds the position of a professor and the coordinator of the Biotechnology Unit.

Professional profile 

Khan's research focus is on developing new inhibitors against multidrug resistant clinical strains with special interest on extended spectrum beta lactamases (ESBL) such as NDM-1 and CTX-M, using QSARR modeling and structure-based virtual screening methods. The team led by him collect Escherichia coli and Klebsiella pneumoniae strains from hospital and community-acquired infection sites and it was during one of those explorations that he discovered a variant of New Delhi metallo-beta-lactamase 1 named NDM-4, more commonly known as Aligarh super bug, in the sewage drains of Jawaharlal Nehru Medical College, Aligarh, in 2014. This was the first recorded sighting of the antibiotic-resistant super bug in India; the finding was later disclosed by Khan in an article published in the Journal of Medical Microbiology. Later, Khan and his colleagues developed a protocol for detecting super bugs and was successful in sequencing the genes of three variants of NDM-1. His studies have been documented by way of a number of articles and ResearchGate, an online repository of scientific articles has listed 241 of them. Besides he has also edited three books.
Khan is a member of the scientific committee of the Indian Academy of Biomedical Sciences and sits in the advisory board of the Sir Syed Global Scholar Award (SSGSA) committee. He is an associate editor of BMC Microbiology for their section on Clinical microbiology and vaccines and is a member of the Task Force on Bioinformatics, Computational and Systems Biology of the Department of Biotechnology. He has also conducted workshops and seminars on the subject.

Awards and honors 
Recipient of Sri Om Prakash Bhasin Award-2019 and visitor's Award 2019 for his trail-blazing research in Biotechnology; The Association of Microbiologists of India (AMI) awarded Khan the Young Scientist Award in 2006; AMI honored him again in 2009 with the Alembic Award. He received the Most Active Teacher Award from Aligarh Muslim University in 2010 and the Cutting-Edge Research Enhancement and Scientific Training (CREST) Award of the Department of Biotechnology in 2011. The Department of Biotechnology (DBT) of the Government of India awarded him the National Bioscience Award for Career Development, one of the highest Indian science awards in 2012. When Aligarh Muslim University instituted the Outstanding Research Award in 2014, he was the first recipient of the award.

Khan was elected as a fellow by the Royal Society of Chemistry in 2017. He is also an elected fellow of the Biotech Research Society, India and the Indian Academy of Microbiological Sciences and the various research fellowships he has received include University Grants Commission fellowship (1995–98), Boyscast fellowship of the Department of Science and Technology  (2004–05) and the visiting fellowship of the Indian National Science Academy (2006–07).

Selected bibliography

See also 

 New Delhi metallo-beta-lactamase 1
 Common multidrug-resistant organisms (MDROs)

Notes

References

Further reading

External links 
 
 
 

N-BIOS Prize recipients
Indian scientific authors
Living people
21st-century Indian biologists
Indian medical researchers
Indian microbiologists
Scientists from Uttar Pradesh
Year of birth missing (living people)
Fellows of the Royal Society of Chemistry
Aligarh Muslim University alumni
Academic staff of Aligarh Muslim University
Rutgers University alumni
Indian biochemists